Naomi Devil (born March 10, 1987), originally Noémi Anna Ördög, is a Hungarian painter and graphic designer.

Education
Naomi Devil was born in Budapest in 1987 as the second child of her parents. She came into contact with art early in her childhood since her grandfather László Ördögh Senior was a painter and her father studied applied arts and became an industrial designer. Devil attended elementary school in Budapest and from the second semester of the tenth grade became a private student in the secondary school. She spent the summer in Salzburg where she attended a five-week course led by professor Caroline Broadhead at the International Summer Academy for Fine Arts. There she decided to become an artist and therefore she completed the last two classes of high school in one year as a private student. She graduated from secondary school at the age of 17 and entered the Academy of Fine Arts Vienna that same year.

She was admitted to the contextual painting class. She began her studies in 2004 in the class of the professors Markus Muntean and Adi Rosenblum. From the second year her professor was Elke Krystufek and from the third year onwards  Ashley Hans Scheirl. She graduated in 2008 and got the title magister of art. In the meantime the artist spent two more summers in Salzburg and attended the courses of Rivka Rinn and Andrea Fogli at the International Summer Academy for Fine Arts.

While studying painting at the Academy of Fine Arts Vienna, Naomi Devil studied from 2006 to 2010 architecture as well  at the Technical University of Vienna. From 2011 she studied graphic design in professor Oliver Kartak's class at the University of Applied Arts Vienna. She graduated in 2015 and got her second academic title.

Artistic activity

Devil works mainly as a painter. She paints with oils on canvas. She allows her skills and experience from the fields of design, architecture and visual arts to flow into her painting methods. She deals with the dialogue between different artistic and historical epochs. She places figures from historical paintings in a contemporary context to call the attention to changes in lifestyle and habits. She selects these situations in such a way that she also reacts to current events.

She has worked on several film productions with digital 3D animations. She made the digital reconstructions of Nicolas Schöffer's lost or never realized works for the film The wonderful world of Nicolas Schöffer. The director of the film was Sándor Gerebics.  The film was shown on the occasion of the Expo 2015 in Milan.

Devil also works as a curator. She organized artist exchange exhibitions between Hungary and Austria.

Her work has been exhibited in more than a dozen countries since 2004. In February 2019 the Exhibition Hall Műcsarnok in Budapest presented a retrospective exhibition of her works. The curator of the exhibition was Zoltán Rockenbauer.

Awards

 2021: MAOE (National Association of Hungarian Artists) professional distinction on the occasion of the travelling exhibition  The Universe of Dante 
 2020: Artfacts Performance Award, Berlin
 2020: Red Carpet Art Award, Special Distinction
 2018: EGA Women's Art Award
 2017: Art Award of the Schönbrunn Professional Association of Austrian Artists, Vienna
 2017: VI. Water and Life International Biennial of Fine Arts, Caffart Award
 2017: La Femme 50 Talented Young Hungarians
 2014: Red Carpet Art Award, Special Distinction
 2006: Salzburg International Summer Academy of Fine Arts scholarship

Selection of solo exhibitions
 2023 Obsession, NACO (Nagyházi Contemporary) Gallery, Budapest
 2022 Kohle auf Leinwand, GPL Contemporary, Vienna (parallel with: Mich zwickt's immer so im Wad'l, Leo Mayr sculptor)
 2021-2022 Naomi Devil Retrospective, Irányi Palace, Budapest
 2021	 Naomi Devil Retrospective, Csabagyöngye Cultural Center, Békéscsaba, Hungary
 2020	 Return to Natur, Ady25 Gallery, Budapest
 2019	 Spaces (Ap)art, Exhibition Hall Műcsarnok, Budapest
 2019	 Naomi Devil, Large Work Show, EGA Women's Center, Vienna
 2019	 Naomi Devil Solo Exhibition, Kolja Kramer Fine Arts, Art Hub Brotfabrik, Vienna
 2018	 Summer in the City, Ar2day Gallery, Budapest
 2017	 O tempora o mores, Austria Auction Company, Vienna
 2016	 Hedonati, EGA Women's Center, Vienna
 2016	 Hedonati, Naomi Devil, Városi Galéria Kalocsa, Hungary
 2014	 Virtaura, Próféta Gallery, Budapest
 2013 Looking back to the future, MOYA (Museum of Young Art Vienna)
 2012	 Globális Útvesztőkön, Városi Galéria, Kalocsa
 2007	 SPACE WARP, Hungarian Cultural Center, Prague

References

External links
 
 Entry in recognized artist database artfacts
 Entry in recognized artist database Basis Wien 
 Entry in recognized artist database Art Net

1987 births
Living people
Austrian painters
Hungarian painters
University of Applied Arts Vienna alumni
Academy of Fine Arts Vienna alumni
21st-century Austrian painters
21st-century Hungarian painters
Artists from Vienna
Artists from Budapest
Hungarian graphic designers